Linze County is one of the 58 counties of Gansu province, China, bordering Inner Mongolia to the northeast. It is under the administration of the prefecture-level city of Zhangye. Its postal code is 734200, and in 1999 its population was 144,613 people.

Administrative divisions
Linze County is divided to 7 towns and 6 others.
Towns

Others

Climate

Transport 
China National Highway 312

See also
 List of administrative divisions of Gansu

References

Linze County
Zhangye